József Háda (2 March 1911 - 11 January 1994) was a Hungarian football goalkeeper who played for Hungary in the 1934 and 1938 FIFA World Cups. He also played for Ferencvárosi TC.

References

External links
 FIFA profile

1911 births
Hungarian footballers
Hungary international footballers
Association football goalkeepers
Hungarian football managers
Hungarian expatriate football managers
Ferencvárosi TC footballers
1934 FIFA World Cup players
1938 FIFA World Cup players
Footballers from Budapest
Hungarian expatriate sportspeople in Sudan
Expatriate football managers in Sudan
Sudan national football team managers
1994 deaths
1957 African Cup of Nations managers
1959 African Cup of Nations managers